HX 112 was a North Atlantic convoy of the HX series which ran during the battle of the Atlantic in the Second World War. It saw the loss of U-boats commanded by two of the Kriegsmarine's most celebrated commanders and propaganda heroes:  under Otto Kretschmer (POW), and  under Joachim Schepke (KIA).

Prelude 
HX 112 was an east-bound convoy of ships which sailed from Halifax on 1 March 1941, making for Liverpool with war materials.  Many of the ships in HX 112 were tankers carrying fuel oil to Britain.

On 15 March 1941 HX 112 was sighted by  commanded by Fritz-Julius Lemp, who sent in a sighting report and commenced shadowing the convoy.

Action 

On the night of 15th/16th the attack started; U-110 was able to torpedo a tanker, which burst into flames, but survived to reach port; all other attacks that night were frustrated by the activities of the escorts.

Keeping up with the convoy on the surface during the day, the pack tried again as night fell on the 16th.

U-99 managed to penetrate the convoy from the north, on its port side, and sank three tankers and a freighter and damaged another tanker in under an hour.  Remaining with the central column of the convoy she sank another freighter 15 minutes later before making her getaway.

Meanwhile, the escorts, searching for U-boats outside the convoy perimeter, found U-100 around 1.30am moving in on the surface.  She dived, but Walker attacked with a depth charge pattern at close range.  U-100 evaded further damage, and surfaced, to be sighted and rammed by Vanoc just after 3am; Schepke was killed when Vanoc smashed into his periscope structure and U-100 went down with most of her crew.

As this was happening, U-99 was making her escape; she nearly collided with a destroyer in the dark and dived.  Picked up on ASDIC by Walker, she was depth-charged and severely damaged.  Saving U-99 from being crushed as she sank deeper and deeper, Kretschmer brought her to the surface, where she was fired on by the encircling warships.  U-99 was sunk, but Kretschmer and most of his crew were saved, to be taken prisoner.

There were no further attacks on HX.112 and the convoy arrived in Liverpool on 20 March.

Ships in the convoy

Allied merchant ships
A total of 41 merchant vessels joined the convoy, either in Halifax or later in the voyage.

Convoy escorts
A series of armed military ships escorted the convoy at various times during its journey.

Conclusion 
HX.112 had lost six ships totalling 50,000 tons. However, the loss of two of the Kriegsmarine's successful U-boat commanders and propaganda heroes was a severe blow to the Kriegsmarine offensive. The defence of HX.112, coupled with the successful defence of Convoy OB 293 and the loss of U-boat commander Günther Prien along with his sub  the previous week, marked a minor turning point in the Atlantic campaign.

References

Bibliography
 Stephen Roskill : The War at Sea 1939–1945  Vol I  (1954).  ISBN (none)
 Dan van der Vat : The Atlantic Campaign (1988).  
 Arnold Hague : The Allied Convoy System 1939–1945 (2000).  ISBN (Canada) 1 55125 033 0 .   ISBN (UK) 1 86176 147 3
 Paul Kemp  : U-Boats Destroyed  ( 1997). 
 Axel Neistle  : German U-Boat Losses during World War II (1998). 

HX112
Naval battles of World War II involving Canada
C